Ratmirovo is a rural locality (a selo) in Rozhdestvenskoye Rural Settlement, Sobinsky District, Vladimir Oblast, Russia. The population was 23 as of 2010.

Geography 
Ratmirovo is located 32 km north of Sobinka (the district's administrative centre) by road. Rozhdestveno is the nearest rural locality.

References 

Rural localities in Sobinsky District